A sangoma a is practitioner of traditional medicine.

Sangoma may also refer to:

 Sangoma, Limpopo, a village in South Africa 
 Sangoma Technologies Corporation
 Sangoma (Abdullah Ibrahim album), a 1973 recording
 Sangoma (Miriam Makeba album), a 1988 recording